The Poor Law Commission was a body established to administer poor relief after the passing of the Poor Law Amendment Act 1834. The commission was made up of three commissioners who became known as "The Bashaws of Somerset House", their secretary and nine clerks or assistant commissioners. The commission lasted until 1847 when it was replaced by a Poor Law Boardthe Andover workhouse scandal being one of the reasons for this change.

Edwin Chadwick, one of the writers of the 1832 Royal Commission hoped to become Commissioner but instead only got the post of Secretary. This caused clashes with the Poor Law Commissioners. This was one reason the Poor Law Commission was eventually abolishedthere was too much infighting within the organisation.

Powers
The Poor Law Commission was independent of Parliament. This made it vulnerable to criticism from those inside Parliament. In the parishes the commissioners were almost universally hated. The Commission had the power to issue directives but there was no way to make parishes do what the Commission wanted them to do. The Commission however did have powers over dietaries for the workhouse and it could veto appointments to boards of guardianstherefore making it difficult for the parishes that opposed it.

Implementation of the Poor Law
Edwin Chadwick, the Secretary to the Poor Law Commission, wanted the New Poor Law to be implemented at first in the north of England where, at that time, there were few economic problems: employment was high and food was plentiful.
But the narrow base of the economy posed the problem that unemployment could fluctuate wildly. This made implementation of the Act difficult as it was a physical impossibility to build a workhouse which could hold the large numbers affected by cyclical employment.

James Kay-Shuttleworth, an Assistant Commissioner supported the introduction of the Poor Law Amendment Act in the North and believed that pauperism was caused by the "recklesness [sic] and improvidence of the native population [and the] barbarism of the Irish."

Poor Law Commissioners, 1834-1847

References

Further reading
 

Poor Law in Britain and Ireland
1834 establishments in the United Kingdom
1847 disestablishments in the United Kingdom